The black-nostril false moray, blacknose false moray or  blacknose reef eel (Kaupichthys atronasus), is an eel in the family Chlopsidae. It was described by Leonard Peter Schultz in 1953. It is a tropical, marine eel which is known from throughout the Indo-Pacific, including the Chagos Islands, Samoa, the Ryukyu Islands, the southern Great Barrier Reef, and Micronesia. It typically dwells in coral reefs at depths greater than 14 m.

The black-nostril false moray is considered an uncommon species.

References

black-nostril false moray
Marine fish of Northern Australia
Taxa named by Leonard Peter Schultz
black-nostril false moray